Dreaming of Revenge is the fourth album by the American guitarist Kaki King, released in 2008.

The album was leaked on February 22, 2008, less than a month before its official release.

On March 4, 2008, iTunes released a full version of Dreaming of Revenge featuring the bonus track "I Need a Girl Who Knows a Map".

On March 11, Amoeba Records released a version of Dreaming of Revenge that included a Vinyl 33' copy of "Pull Me Out Alive" with the unreleased B-Side "Zeitgeist".

In early April, The Japanese Edition of Dreaming of Revenge was released with Both "Zeitgeist" and "I Need a Girl Who Knows a Map" on the same disc, along with full lyrics to all songs sung on the album.

Critical reception

Writing for Allmusic, music critic Thom Jurek wrote "This is not a remarkable album by any stretch, although its packaging is — it contains a punch-out mobile as a booklet — but it is a further step in the development of a singular and ever elusive artist who possesses a truckload of talent, but is still unsure of which direction to head to realize it all." Leah Greenblatt of Entertainment Weekly called it King's most "sophisticated release yet."

Track listing

Personnel
Kaki King – vocals, guitar (electric/acoustic), slide guitar, bass, drums, piano
Malcolm Burn - Keyboards, Bass, Percussion, Electric Guitar, Harmonica
Craig Santiago - Bass Drums (Track #3)
Dan Brantigan: Analog EVI (Track #4)
Yuval Semo: Keyboards (Track #6)
Elissa Cassini: First Violin (Track #6, 10)
Funda Cizmecioglu: Second Violin (Track #6, 10)
Youyoung Kim: Viola (Track #6, 9, 10)
Jane O'Hara: Cello (Track #6, 9, 10)
Dave Treut: Clarinet, Drums (Track #7, 10)
Bora Yoon: Viola (Track #9)
String Arrangements by Yuval Semo (Track #6) and Kyle Sanna (Tracks #9 and 10).

Production
Malcolm Burn – Producer; recorded at Le Maison Bleue Studios
Jeff Krasno - Executive Producer
Sean Hoess - Executive Producer
Christen Greene - Project Coordinator
Louis Teran - Photos
Seb Jarnot - Design and Layout 
All songs written by Kaki King for Kaki King Music (BMI). Administered by Domino Music Publishing.

References 

2008 albums
Kaki King albums
Albums produced by Malcolm Burn